Martin Lake may refer to several places:

In Australia
 Lake Martin (Victoria), a lake in Victoria

 In Canada
 Martin Lake (Nova Scotia), in Dartmouth, Nova Scotia
 Martin Lake (Saskatchewan), in Northern Saskatchewan
 Martin Lake (British Columbia), in the Chilcotin area of British Columbia

 In the United States
Lake Martin in Louisiana swamps, Louisiana
Lake Martin, Alabama
Logan Martin Lake, Talladega and St. Clair Counties, Alabama
Martin Lake Power Plant, a coal-fired power plant in Tatum, Texas
Martins Fork Lake, Harlan County, Kentucky
Martin Lake, Minnesota, census-designated place in Linwood Township, Anoka County, Minnesota
Martin Lake (Anoka County, Minnesota), in Linwood Township, Anoka County, Minnesota
Martin Lake (Martin County, Minnesota)
 Martin Lake (Blaine County, Montana), in Blaine County, Montana
 Martin Lake (Carbon County, Montana), in Carbon County, Montana
 Martin Lake (Granite County, Montana), in Granite County, Montana
 Martin Lake (Hill County, Montana), in Hill County, Montana
 Martin Lake (Powell County, Montana), in Powell County, Montana